is a Japanese voice actress affiliated with 81 Produce. She won the Best Rookie Actress Award at the 10th Seiyu Awards. She debuted as a singer under Wave Master with her debut album "Cobalt". She is also the voice provider of Internet Co., Ltd.'s Vocaloid 4 vocal Otomachi Una, as well as the voice provider of Una's Talk EX, VOICEROID2, and Voidol speech voicebanks.

Filmography

Anime series
{| class="wikitable" style="font-size: 90%;"
! Year
! Title
! Role
! Notes
|-
| rowspan="7" |2013
| Unlimited Psychic Squad
| Child
|
|-
| Aikatsu!
| Girl
|
|-
| Stella Women’s Academy, High School Division Class C³
| Girl, Girl A, Kaori, Kyōko
|
|-
| Hayate the Combat Butler! Cuties
| Audience
|
|-
| Danchi Tomoo
| Boy; Haruka Fukuoka; Serizawa
|
|-
| Yowamushi Pedal
| Schoolgirl
|  
|-
| Line Town
| Alien
| 
|-
| rowspan="7" | 2014
| The Pilot's Love Song
| Nina Viento's actress
|
|-
| Tokyo ESP
| Girl
|
|-
| Dragon Collection
| Friend A
|
|-
| Laughing Under the Clouds
| Gerokichi, Poko
| 
|-
| Hanayamata
| Guest
|
|-
| Yuki Yuna is a Hero
| Classmate
|
|-
| Wasimo
| Hiyori
| 
|-
| rowspan="10" | 2015
|Absolute Duo
| Miwa
| 
|-
| Cross Ange
| Priestess
|
|-
| Blood Blockade Battlefront
| Nurse
|
|-
| Tai-Madō Gakuen 35 Shiken Shōtai
| Degarashi/Kanaria
|
|-
| Pikaia!
| Wendy
| 
|-
| Himouto! Umaru-chan
| Umaru Doma
|
|-
| Magical Somera-chan
| Aya Matsushima
| 
|-
| Wish Upon the Pleiades
| Yuki, Yuzuru, Nanako's brother
|
|-
| Yamada-kun and the Seven Witches
| Eri
|
|-
| Lance N' Masques
| Ryū Yuien
|
|-
| rowspan="13" | 2016
|Aikatsu Stars!
| Maaya Kanno
|
|-
| Active Raid: Kidō Kyōshūshitsu Daihachigakari 2nd
| Marimo Kaburagi
|  
|-
| Kamiwaza Wanda
| Girl
| 
|-
| Kyōkai no Rinne
| Kana Noroi
|
|-
| This Art Club Has a Problem!
| Moeka, Girl (episode 6)
| 
|-
| The Disastrous Life of Saiki K.
| Kusuo Saiki (young)
|
|-
| Show by Rock!!
| Peipain
| 
|-
| Time Travel Girl
| Jean
| 
|-
|  Time Bokan 24
| Sister
|
|-
| Dagashi Kashi
| Ono
|
|-
| Hybrid × Heart Magias Academy Ataraxia
| Grace
|
|-
| Re:Zero − Starting Life in Another World
| Plum Risch (Kadomon's daughter)
|
|-
| ReLIFE
| Volleyball Club Member B
|
|-
| rowspan="15" | 2017
| Interviews with Monster Girls
| Schoolgirl
|
|-
| Little Witch Academia
| Girl
|
|-
| MARGINAL #4 the Animation
| Rui Aiba (young)
|
|-
| Twin Angels BREAK
| Koromi Ukari, RunRun
|  
|-
| Atom: The Beginning
| Shizu Akiba
|
|-
| The Laughing Salesman'
| Fake grandson
|
|-
| Chi's Sweet Home| Child A
|
|-
| Infini-T Force| Anna Kurosawa
|
|-
| Dia Horizon| Sofia
| 
|-
| Two Car| Megumi Meguro
| 
|-
| My Girlfriend is Shobitch| Schoolgirl
|
|-
| Anime-Gatari| Schoolgirl
|
|-
| Juni Taisen| Grandson
| 
|-
| Kyōkai no Rinne| Kana Noroi
|
|-
| Himouto! Umaru-chan R| Umaru Doma
| 
|-
| rowspan="4" | 2018
| Aikatsu Friends!| Marin Manami
| 
|-
| Food Wars!: Shokugeki no Soma| Berta
| 
|-
| Anima Yell!| Akane Sawatari
| 
|-
|  Baki the Grappler| Child
| 
|-
| rowspan="4" | 2019
| How Clumsy you are, Miss Ueno| Tanaka
| 
|-
| Fruits Basket| Female student
| 
|-
|  Aikatsu on Parade!| Marin Manami
| 
|-
|  Re:Stage! Dream Days♪| Misaki Sango
| 
|-
| 2020
| Re:Zero − Starting Life in Another World| Ryuzu Meyer
| 
|-
| rowspan="3" |2021
| So I'm a Spider, So What?| Yuri
| 
|-
| Non Non Biyori Nonstop| Akane Shinoda
| 
|-
| Tropical-Rouge! Pretty Cure| Kururun, Hina
| 
|-
| 2023
| Malevolent Spirits| Kagami
| 
|-
|}

Original video animation

Video games

DubbingA Good Man (Mya (Sofia Nicolaescu))Resident Alien (Max Hawthorne (Judah Prehn))Swiss Army Man'' (Crissie (Antonia Ribero))

Other

Discography

Mini Album

References

External links
 
 

1992 births
Living people
Voice actresses from Tokyo
81 Produce voice actors
Japanese voice actresses
21st-century Japanese actresses